The 2007 China Open Super Series is the eleventh tournament of the 2007 BWF Super Series in badminton. It was held in Guangzhou, China from November 20 to November 25, 2007.

Men's singles

Seeds
 Lin Dan
 Lee Chong Wei
 Bao Chunlai
 Chen Jin
 Peter Gade
 Chen Yu
 Sony Dwi Kuncoro
 Kenneth Jonassen

Results

Women's singles

Seeds
 Xie Xingfang
 Zhang Ning
 Lu Lan
 Zhu Lin
 Wang Chen
 Pi Hongyan
 Xu Huaiwen
 Petya Nedelcheva

Results

Men's doubles

Seeds
 Koo Kien Keat / Tan Boon Heong
 Fu Haifeng / Cai Yun
 Markis Kido / Hendra Setiawan
 Candra Wijaya /  Tony Gunawan
 Jung Jae-sung / Lee Yong-dae
 Choong Tan Fook / Lee Wan Wah
 Jens Eriksen / Martin Lundgaard Hansen
 Lee Jae-jin / Hwang Ji-man

Results

Women's doubles

Seeds
 Zhang Yawen / Wei Yili
 Yang Wei / Zhang Jiewen
 Lee Kyung-won / Lee Hyo-jung
 Chien Yu Chin / Cheng Wen-Hsing
 Gao Ling / Zhao Tingting
 Lilyana Natsir / Vita Marissa
 Gail Emms / Donna Kellogg
 Kumiko Ogura / Reiko Shiota

Results

Mixed doubles

Seeds
 Gao Ling / Zheng Bo
 Lilyana Natsir / Nova Widianto
 Gail Emms / Nathan Robertson
 Zhang Yawen / Xie Zhongbo
 Vita Marissa / Flandy Limpele
 Donna Kellogg / Anthony Clark
 Kamilla Rytter Juhl / Thomas Laybourn
 Yu Yang / He Hanbin

Results

External links
Tournamentsoftware.com: China Open Super Series 2007

China Open Super Series
China Open (badminton)
China Open